Grande nazione is an album from Italian rock band Litfiba. It was released in 2012.

Track listing

"Fiesta tosta" – 4:00 (P. Pelù, F. Renzulli)
"Squalo" – 4:17 (P. Pelù, F. Renzulli)
"Elettrica" – 4:11 (P. Pelù, F. Renzulli)
"Tra te e me" – 4:30 (P. Pelù, F. Renzulli)
"Tutti buoni" – 3:50 (P. Pelù, F. Renzulli)
"Luna dark" – 4:22 (P. Pelù, F. Renzulli)
"Anarcoide" – 3:40 (P. Pelù, F. Renzulli)
"Grande Nazione" – 5:04 (P. Pelù, F. Renzulli)
"Brado" – 4:34 (P. Pelù, F. Renzulli)
"La mia valigia" – 4:57 (P. Pelù, F. Renzulli)

Bonus track

"Dimmi dei nazi" – 6:41

Personnel
Piero Pelù – vocals
Ghigo Renzulli – guitars
Federico Sagona – keyboards
Daniele Bagni – bass
Pino Fidanza – drums

2012 albums
Litfiba albums
Italian-language albums